The 2022–23 Oral Roberts Golden Eagles men's basketball team represented Oral Roberts University in the 2022–23 NCAA Division I men's basketball season. The Golden Eagles, led by sixth-year head coach Paul Mills, played their home games at the Mabee Center in Tulsa, Oklahoma, as members of the Summit League.

Previous season
The Golden Eagles finished the 2021–22 season 19–12, 12–6 in Summit League play to finish in fourth place. In the Summit League tournament, they defeated Western Illinois before falling to North Dakota State. They did not receive an invitation to the NCAA tournament or any other postseason tournament.

Roster

Schedule and results

|-
!colspan=12 style=| Regular season

|-
!colspan=9 style=|

|-
!colspan=12 style=}| NCAA tournament

Sources

References

Oral Roberts Golden Eagles men's basketball seasons
Oral Roberts Golden Eagles
Oral Roberts Golden Eagles men's basketball
Oral Roberts Golden Eagles men's basketball
Oral Roberts